Kazem Rahimi (born 23 October 1942) is a retired Iranian football striker.

Rahimi was born in Tehran and has played for Shahin, Persepolis, Paykan Tehran, and Homa.

References

1942 births
Living people
Iranian footballers
Shahin FC players
Persepolis F.C. players
Paykan F.C. players
Association football midfielders